Minoru Kawasaki may refer to: